Hatuniye Medresseh, is a historical medrese in Karaman, Turkey, built in the 14th century. The like-named Hatuniye Külliyesi in Tokat is a century younger, and refers to another woman.

History 
Ottoman Sultan Murat Hüdavendigar's daughter Sultan Hatun, wife of Karamanoğlu Alaattin Bey, ordered the construction in 1382. The architect of the Medrese is Numanoğlu Hoca Ahmed (Hodja Ahmed, son of Numan), according to the kitabe (inscription) of the building.

The building is made of cut stone from around Karaman and the main gate (portal) from marble.

Gallery

References

External links
 Virtual tour in English 

Religious buildings and structures completed in 1382
Buildings and structures in Karaman Province
Ottoman architecture in Turkey
Madrasas in Turkey
Buildings and structures of the Ottoman Empire
1382 establishments in Asia
14th-century madrasas